Kumar Bishwajit (born 1 June 1963) is a Bangladeshi singer and composer. He received Bangladesh National Film Award for Best Male Playback Singer two times for the films Swami Streer Wada (2009) and Ma Amar Chokher Moni (2011). He also got the Best Music Composer award for Swami Streer Wada.

Early life
Also known by his nickname "Tultul", Bishwajit was born on 1 June 1963, to Sadhan Ranjan Dey and Sova Rani Dey in Sitakunda, Chittagong, Bangladesh. He started his music career by performing on a radio show in 1977. He passed childhood in Chittagong district and took primary education from Chittagong. He used to come and go to Dhaka for his career. He was first associated with the band Rhythm-77 for 2 years. Then he founded his own band "Feelings" in 1979. After leaving feelings, he joined Souls and performed only in the first album. Biswajit's "Tore Putuler Moto Kore Shajiye" is originally a song of the first album of Souls, Super Souls. Then he left the band and went on to pursue his solo career. He performed his first television show on BTV in 1980.

Career
, Bishwajit has released more than 30 solo music albums.

Works

Solo

Film scores
 Wrong Number (2004)
 Swami Streer Wada (2009)
 Jaago (2010)
 Ma Amar Chokher Moni (2011)

Souls

 Super Souls (1982)

Books
 Abong Bishwajit (2022)

Filmography
{| class="wikitable plainrowheaders" width="100%" textcolor:#000;"
|- style="background:#cfc; text-align:center;"
| scope="col" width=21%| Year
| scope="col" width=21%| Film
| scope="col" width=23%|Song
| scope="col" width=20%|Composer(s)
| scope="col" width=20%|Songwriter(s)
| scope="col" width=20%|Co-singer(s)
|-
| 1983
!rowspan=1| Protirodh
| "Shono Shoma Ektu Darao"
| rowspan=1| Sheikh Sadi Khan  
| Nazrul Islam Babu 
| Haimanti Shukla 
|-
| 1984
!Norom Gorom 
| "Ore O Banshiwala"
| Subal Das 
| Ahmed Zaman Chowdhury 
| Anju Ghosh 
|-
| rowspan=7| 1985
!Rowspan=| Raj Kopal
| "Koto Rongo Jaano Re"
| rowspan=| Alauddin Ali 
| rowspan=| Amjad Hossain
| Runa Laila 
|-
! rowspan=6| Prem Kahini
| "Esona, O Amar Jiboner Jibon" (duet)
| rowspan=6| Alauddin Ali 
| rowspan=6| Gazi Mazharul Anwar 
| Sabina Yasmin 
|-
| "Picnic, Aaj Picinic"
| Runa Laila
|-
| "Ami Je Preme Porechhi" (duet)
| Rulia Rahman 
|-
| "Esona, O Amar Jiboner Jibon" (male)
| rowspan=3| solo
|-
| "Esona, O Amar Jiboner Jibon" (short)
|-
| "Ami Je Preme Porechhi" (short)
|-
| rowspan=4| 1987
! Rowspan=4| Protirodh
| "Shanai Bajbe, Bajbe Bajbe Shanai"
| rowspan=4| Sheikh Sadi Khan 
| rowspan=4| Nazrul Islam Babu, Mozammel Haque 
| rowspan=2| Manabendra Mukherjee, Sabina Yasmin   
|-
| "Shanai Bajbe, Bajbe, Bajbe Shanai" (sad)
|-
| "Hridoy Debe Naki"
| Sabina Yasmin 
|-
| "Shono Soma, Ektu Darao"
| Haimanti Shukla  
|-
| 1988
!Jogajog
| "Kochi Kacha Patar Moto"
| Alauddin Ali 
| Gazi Mazharul Anwar 
| Runa Laila  
|-
| 1999
!Laal Badshah
| "Amar Moner Uttore Dokkhine"
| Abu Taher
| Moniruzzaman Monir 
| Kanak Chapa 
|-
| rowspan=3| 2000  
! rowspan=| 'Bortoman| "Jaane Januk Jogotbasi"
| rowspan=| Ahmed Imtiaz Bulbul 
| rowspan=| Ahmed Imtiaz Bulbul 
| Kanak Chapa 
|-
! rowspan=2| Kukkhato Khuni| "Ei Hridoyer Sada Kagoje" (version 1)
| rowspan=2| Shawkat Ali Emon 
| rowspan=2| Kabir Bakul 
| rowspan=2| Kanak Chapa 
|-
| "Ei Hridoyer Sada Kagoje" (version 2)
|-
| rowspan=2| 2001
! Rowspan=2| Tandob Lila| "Dao Onno, Dao Bostro"
| rowspan=2| Ahmed Imtiaz Bulbul 
| rowspan=2| Ahmed Imtiaz Bulbul 
|rowspan=2| solo
|-
| "Dao Onno, Dao Bostro" (reprise)
|-
| rowspan=3| 2002
!Itihas| "Bhita Nai Re"
| Ahmed Imtiaz Bulbul 
| Ahmed Imtiaz Bulbul 
| solo
|-
! Rowspan=2| Swami Streer Juddho| "Aaj Mon Pherari"
| rowspan=2| Shawkat Ali Emon
| rowspan=2| Kabir Bakul 
| rowspan=2| Anima D'Costa
|-
| "Hridoyta Hoye Gelo Churi"
|-
| rowspan=4| 2003
! Rowspan=| Baba| "Ei Prithibir Shuru Aar Shesh"
| rowspan=| Alauddin Ali 
| rowspan=| Kabir Bakul 
| Kanak Chapa 
|-
!Big Boss| "Hajaro Surjo Dube Jabe"
| Alauddin Ali 
| Kabir Bakul 
| Kanak Chapa  
|-
!rowspan=2| Dui Bodhu Ek Shami| "Bhalobashte Giye Ami"
|rowspan=2| Alam Khan 
|rowspan=2| Kabir Bakul 
| Sabina Yasmin, Baby Naznin
|-
| "Proti Second Proti Minute"
| Kanak Chapa 
|-
| rowspan=2| 2004
!Baap Betar Lorai| "Shono Priya Shono"
| Shawkat Ali Emon 
| N/A
| Anima Roy  
|-
!Bachao| "Chokhe Chokh Porle"
| Emon Saha 
|  
| Rizia Parvin  
|-
| 2005
!Phuler Moto Bou| "Amake Chhara Aar Kauke"
| Emon Saha
| Gazi Mazharul Anwar 
| solo
|-
| 2007
!Moner Sathe Juddho| "Pagol Korechho Tumi"
| Emon Saha 
| Ashraf Babu 
| Mimi Naznin  
|-
| rowspan=2| 2009
!Bolona Kobul| "Amaro Jibone Tumi"
| Shawkat Ali Emon  
| N/A
| Samina Chowdhury   
|-
!Tumi Amar Swami| "Deewana Deewana"
| Emom Saha
| Kabir Bakul 
| solo
|-
|rowspan=2| 2010
!rowspan=2| 5 Takar Prem| "Ektukhani Thomke Gelam"
|rowspan=2| Shawkat Ali Emon 
|rowspan=2| Kabir Bakul 
| Mimi Naznin 
|-
| "Bachi Kemone Bolo"
| Soniya
|-
| rowspan=2| 2012
!rowspan=2| Ek Mon Ek Pran| "Bidhata Jototuku Bhalobeseche"
| Rowspan=2| Shawkat Ali Emon 
| Rowspan=2| 
| Nazmun Munira Nancy
|-
| "Cholte Cholte Poth Phurabe"
| Kanak Chapa 
|-
| 2013
!Ki Prem Dekhaila| "Tumi Shono Shono"
| Shawkat Ali Emon 
| Kabir Bakul 
| Dolly Sayontoni  
|-
| 2016
!Dhumketu| N/A
| Ahmed Humayun 
| Sudip Kumar Dip 
| N/A
|-
| 2021
!Chironjeeb Mujib| N/A
| Emon Saha 
| N/A
| solo
|-
|}

Personal life
Bishwajit is married to Naima Sultana(Muslim). Their only son, Kumar Nibir.

Awards
 Bangladesh National Film Award for Best Male Playback Singer  for Swami Strir Wada (2009) and Ma Amar Chokher Moni (2011)
 Bangladesh National Film Award for Best Music Composer for Swami Strir Wada (2009)
 Film Bangla  Best Playback Singer Male  Award for Jaago – Dare to Dream'' (2010)

References

External links
 

Living people
1963 births
Bengali Hindus
Bangladeshi Hindus
20th-century Bangladeshi male singers
20th-century Bangladeshi singers
21st-century Bangladeshi male singers
21st-century Bangladeshi singers
Best Male Playback Singer National Film Award (Bangladesh) winners
Best Music Composer National Film Award (Bangladesh) winners